Philip Bisse (1667 – 6 September 1721) was an English bishop.

Life

He was born in Oldbury-on-the-Hill, Gloucestershire, the son of John Bisse, a clerk and educated at Winchester College and New College, Oxford, ordained in 1686 and graduating M.A. in 1693. He was elected a Fellow of the Royal Society in March, 1706.

He was Bishop of St David's from 1710 to 1713. In 1713 he became the Bishop of Hereford, a post he held until his death in 1721. He was on the Commission for Building Fifty New Churches.

In 1705, he married Lady Bridget Osborne, widow of Charles FitzCharles, 1st Earl of Plymouth and daughter of Sir Thomas Osborne, 1st Duke of Leeds and Bridget Bertie.

Family

His brother, the Rev. Dr. Thomas Bisse, was the Chancellor of Hereford Cathedral and in 1724 organised a "Music Meeting" which subsequently became the Three Choirs Festival.

Thomas, like his brother was son of John Bisse, of Oldbury-on-Severn, co. Gloucester. He matriculated at New College on 30 Sept 1691, aged 16; was a fellow of Corpus Christi College, Oxford, was awarded BA in 1695, MA on 2 Mar 1698–9, BD in 1708, and DD on 27 Jan 1712–13. He was a preacher at the Rolls Chapel, London, 1715. Prebend of Hereford 1713, chancellor of Hereford (cathedral) 1716. He was rector of Cradley and a portion of Ledbury 1713, and of Weston-under-Penyard, co. Hereford, 1716. He died on 22 April 1731, aged 56.

A descendant and last of the line was Thomas Chaloner Bisse (1788–1872).

Notes

References

 Clergydatabase
 Foster's works on Oxford and things Ecclesiastical

Some sermons
The Merit and Usefulness of Building Churches. A Sermon Preach'd at the Opening of the Church of St. Marie in the Town and County of Southampton on Christmas-day, 1711, by Thomas Bisse.
printed for Henry Clements, in Oxford; and are to be sold by Henry Clements, [London], 1712. (26 pages)A Course of Sermons on the Lord's-prayer Preach'd at the Rolls by the Revd. Thomas Bisse. Printed from the author's original manuscripts, and publish'd by Thomas Bisse, A.M. Chaplain of All-Souls-College, Oxon., 1740, (284 pages).The Beauty of Holiness in the Common-prayer: As Set Forth in Four Sermons Preached at the Rolls Chapel, in the Year 1716''. By Tho. Bisse,
printed by W. Bowyer, for W. Taylor; and W. and J. Innys, 1720. (173 pages)

1667 births
1721 deaths
Bishops of St Davids
Bishops of Hereford
18th-century Church of England bishops
Fellows of the Royal Society
18th-century Welsh Anglican bishops